Tir is the fourth month of the Solar Hijri calendar, which is the official calendar of Iran and Afghanistan. Tir has thirty-one days, spanning parts of June and July in the Gregorian calendar. In Afghan Persian it is called Saraṭān (Cancer).

Tir is the first month of summer, and is followed by Amardad. Named after, Tishtrya, a Zoroastrian benevolent divinity associated with life-bringing rainfall and fertility.

Events 
 14 - 1155 - The Second Continental Congress adopts the Declaration of Independence of the United States.
 24 - 1168 - Storming of the Bastille
 11 - 1246 - The British North America Act takes effect, marking the unification of the British Province of Canada, Nova Scotia, and New Brunswick into one Dominion of Canada.
 2 - 1273 - International Olympic Committee established
 1 - 1320 - World War II - Operation Barbarossa begins (Defense of Brest Fortress)
 3 - 1324 - Moscow Victory Parade of 1945
 7 - 1360 - Hafte Tir bombing in Tehran
 4 - 1370 - Independence of Slovenia and Croatia from Yugoslav Federation; triggering the start of the Yugoslav War.
 8 - 1374 - Sampoong Department Store collapse in South Korea
 25 - 1395 - Attempted coup d'etat in Turkey

Deaths 

 4 - 1392 - Taghi Rouhani, Iranian radio news anchor.
 7 - 1360 - Mohammad Beheshti, one of the architects of the Islamic Republic of Iran
 22 - 1391 - Hamid Samandarian, Iranian film and theater director and translator.
 26 - 1390 - Rouhollah Dadashi, Iranian Powerlifter, Bodybuilder and Strongman.
 29 - 1391 - Mohammad Hassan Ganji, an Iranian meteorologist and academic.

Observances 
 Olympic Day - 2 or 3 Tir
 Canada Day - 10 or 11 Tir
 Tirgan - 13 Tir
 Independence Day (United States) - 14 or 15 Tir
 Independence Day (Venezuela) - 15 or 16 Tir
 Mongolian State Flag Day - 18 or 19 Tir
 Naadam - 19/20  to 22/23 Tir
 Bastille Day - 24 or 25 Tir

References 

Months of the Iranian calendar

hu:Hordád